Aiguilhe is a commune in the Haute-Loire department in south-central France.

Aiguilhe is close to Le Puy-en-Velay, and famous for the Saint Michel chapel. Raymond of Aguilers was from here.

Population

See also
Communes of the Haute-Loire department

References

Communes of Haute-Loire
Velay